The Gibraltar national cricket team is the team that represents the British overseas territory of Gibraltar in international cricket. They have been an associate member of the International Cricket Council (ICC) since 1969.

Gibraltar played in the ICC Trophy (now replaced by the ICC World Cup Qualifier) from 1982 to 2001, with little success. The team has played in the top-flight of the European Cricket Championship on four occasions, and placed sixth (out of eight teams) at 1996 European Cricket Championship held in Denmark in 1996. After the creation of the World Cricket League, Gibraltar was placed in the 2009 Division Seven. It was subsequently relegated to 2010 Division Eight, where another low finish saw the team again relegated, to regional qualifying tournaments.

With approximately 34,000 residents, Gibraltar has one of the smallest populations of any ICC member. Only three members, all fellow dependencies of ICC full members, have a smaller population – in order from largest to smallest, the Cook Islands, Saint Helena, and Falkland Islands.

History

Early years

Cricket has been played in Gibraltar by British servicemen since the late 18th century. A cricket ground is known to have existed north of the Rock of Gibraltar in 1800. Civilians were playing the game as well as servicemen by 1822. The Gibraltar Cricket Club was formed in 1883, and formed the backbone of civilian cricket until well into the 20th Century.

In 1890, a ship carrying the Australia national cricket team on the way to a tour of England, docked in Gibraltar Harbour after a collision with two other ships. The Australians played a game against a Gibraltar Garrison team. The local side were dismissed for just 25, and the Australians won the game, scoring 150/8.

The game was flourishing in the 1930s, with Gibraltar producing many locally born players. However, the Second World War meant a cut back in the game, with many cricket fields giving way to the military, one even being converted into an airfield.

Post-war years

The 1950s saw an increase in clubs, and the Gibraltar Cricket Association was formed in 1960. They were elected to associate membership of the ICC in 1969. Essex County Cricket Club visited after the conclusion of the 1973 English domestic season, and played a Rock XI in a one-day game, winning by 178 runs. Visits by English sides of various ability levels have continued ever since.

In 1982, Gibraltar took part in the second ICC Trophy, without winning a match. They improved on this performance in the 1986 tournament, gaining their first international win against Israel. They performed even better in the next tournament, beating East and Central Africa, Singapore and Israel reaching the plate competition. Israel toured Gibraltar in 1992, winning the match they played against the national side.

Gibraltar finished in 20th place in the 1994 ICC Trophy, and played in the first European Championship in Copenhagen in 1996, finishing sixth after losing to Scotland in a play-off. They finished 19th in the following years ICC Trophy and played poorly in the 1998 European Championship, finishing last in the ten team tournament.

In 1999, Gibraltar hosted a quadrangular tournament also involving France, Israel and Italy, losing in the final to Italy. The European Championship was split into two divisions in 2000, with Gibraltar placed in Division Two, which they won. The following year they travelled to Canada to take part in the 2001 ICC Trophy. A withdrawal by Italy and the non-arrival of West Africa left Gibraltar with just three matches to play against Germany, Namibia and Nepal, losing all of them and not progressing beyond the first round.

Gibraltar defended their European Division Two title in 2002, but could not continue this success in 2004, finishing fifth out of six teams. They did not qualify for the 2005 ICC Trophy, and finished fourth in Division Two of the European Championship in 2006 after losing a play-off to Germany.

Gibraltar placed sixth at the 2009 Global Division Seven tournament and was relegated to Division-eight.

2018-Present
In April 2018, the ICC decided to grant full Twenty20 International (T20I) status to all its members. Therefore, all Twenty20 matches played between Gibraltar and other ICC members after 1 January 2019 will be a full T20I. 

Gibraltar played their first T20I on 26 October 2019, against Portugal, during the 2019 Iberia Cup.

Gibraltar won their first T20I in the 2021 Valletta Cup against Bulgaria. This win came on the back of a century from captain Balaji Pai accompanied by a half century from 16 year old Louis Bruce.

Records and statistics 

International Match Summary — Gibraltar
 
Last updated 3 July 2022

Twenty20 International 
 Highest team total: 217/4 v. Bulgaria on 23 October 2021 at Marsa Sports Club, Marsa, Malta.
 Highest individual score: 107*, Balaji Pai  v. Bulgaria on 23 October 2021 at Marsa Sports Club, Marsa, Malta.
 Best individual bowling figures: 4/25, Iain Latin v. Hungary on 1 July 2022 at Royal Brussels Cricket Club, Waterloo.

T20I record versus other nations

Records complete to T20I #1606. Last updated 3 July 2022.

Other records

ICC Trophy 
 Highest team total: 270/5 v Israel, 18 June 1990 at Sportpark Laag Zestienhoven, Rotterdam
 Highest individual score: 98, Tim Buzaglo v Singapore, 25 February 1994 at Ruaraka Sports Club Ground, Nairobi
 Best individual bowling figures: 5/14, Nigel Churaman v Israel, 30 March 1997 at Rubber Research Institute Ground, Kuala Lumpur

ICC Trophy record versus other nations

One-Day
Below is a record of international matches played in ICC Trophy, European Cricket Championship and World Cricket League events by Gibraltar between 1982 and 2013.

Tournament history

World Cricket League Qualifier 
2012: 3rd place (La Manga)

World Cricket League
2009: 6th place (Division Seven)
2010: 6th place (Division Eight)

ICC Trophy
1979: Did not participate
1982: First round
1986: First round
1990: Plate competition
1994: 20th place
1997: 19th place
2001: First round
2005: Did not qualify

European Championship
1996: 6th place
1998: 10th place
2000: Division Two winners
2002: Division Two winners
2004: 5th place (Division Two)
2006: 4th place (Division Two)
2008: 3rd place (Division Two)
2010: 6th place (Division Two)
2011: 9th place (Division One)
2014: 4th place (Division Two)

T20i Tournaments 

 2008 Iberia Cup: runner-up.
2019 Iberia Cup: 3rd place. 
 2021 Portugal Tri-Nation Series: 3rd place. 
2021 Valletta Cup: 4th place.

See also
 List of Gibraltar Twenty20 International cricketers

References

External links
Official website of the GCA

National cricket teams
Cricket
Gibraltar in international cricket